Masood Akhtar (5 September 1940 – 5 March 2022) was a Pakistani actor and considered one of the versatile actors of the industry.

Early life and education
Masood Akhtar was born in Sahiwal on 5 September 1940 After receiving his primary education from a local school, he entered Military College Murree. Later, he enrolled in MAO College Lahore. After graduation, he started working in a bank, while he continued his studies to earn his Bachelor of Laws degree.

Acting career
Akhtar began his acting career in 1960s with theatre and soon became one of the popular performers on stage. In 1968, director and producer Shabab Kiranwi introduced him to the film industry. He worked in around 135 movies ⁠— 78 Urdu, 51 Punjabi, three double versions and two Pashto. Akhtar is the pioneer of starting stage drama at Alhamra Arts Council. One of his early plays, Paisa Bolta Hai, was staged at Alhamra in the 1970s and it earned him much popularity.

Awards and recognition
 Pride of Performance Award by the Government of Pakistan was announced on 14 August 2005 and then the award was actually conferred on 23 March 2006.

Death
Masood Akhtar died from lung cancer in Lahore on 5 March 2022, at the age of 82. He was hospitalized for two months before his death. He was buried at Gulshan-e-Ravi D block Graveyard. Among the survivors were his widow and two daughters. His 26 years old son Ali Raza had died of a heart attack in September 2021.

Selected filmography
 Sangdil (1968)
 Mera Naam Hai Mohabbat (1975)
 Shabana (1976)
 Amanat (1981)
 Yeh Adam as nasir (1986)
 Insaniyat Kay Dushman (1990)
 Watan Kay Rakhwalay as Bara Mian (1991)
 Madam Rani (1995)
 Moosa Khan (2001)

References

External links
 

1940 births
2022 deaths
20th-century Pakistani male actors
21st-century Pakistani male actors
Male actors in Urdu cinema
Pakistani male film actors
Actors from Punjab, Pakistan
People from Sahiwal
Deaths from lung cancer in Pakistan
Recipients of the Pride of Performance